The LNB Pro B Best Scorer are the season by season individual scoring leaders of the LNB Pro B (Pro B), the second-tier of the French men's basketball system. The criteria set is that the player must play in a certain amount of games wherein he amassed the highest possible average to lead the league in the said statistic.

LNB Pro B Best Scoring leaders

References

External links
Official Site 

 
LNB Pro B awards